Finis may refer to:

 Finiș, a commune in Bihor County, Romania
 Finiș (river), a river in Bihor County, Romania
 "Finis" (short story), the 1906 science fiction / horror story by Frank L. Pollack
 Finis J. Garrett (1875–1956), U.S. Representative and federal judge
 Jefferson Finis Davis (1808–1889), President of the Confederate States of America
 Chancellor Finis Valorum, a fictional character from the Star Wars franchise